Thaxton may refer to:

Places
Thaxton, Mississippi
Thaxton, Virginia

People
Charles Thaxton (born 1939), American author on intelligent design
David Thaxton (born 1982), British musical theatre and opera performer
Hubert Mack Thaxton (1909–1974), American physicist
Jae Thaxton (born 1985), American football player
Jim Thaxton (born 1949), American football player
Jon Thaxton (born 1974), English professional boxer
Lloyd Thaxton (1927–2008), American writer, television producer, director, and television host

See also
William L. Thaxton Jr. House

English-language surnames